Breydin is a municipality in the Barnim district of Brandenburg in Germany.

Demography

References

Localities in Barnim